Back to Front is the sixty-first studio album by American vocal group The Temptations. It was released by New Door Records on October 23, 2007. It contains mostly covers of songs that were hits for Stax Records artists, as well as other non-Motown artists. The album also includes covers of "Minute by Minute" by The Doobie Brothers and "How Deep Is Your Love" by The Bee Gees.

Critical reception

AllMusic editor Alex Henderson found that Back to Front "is not in a class with the Temptations' most essential '60s and '70s recordings, but it is an enjoyably satisfying tribute to R&B's pre-urban contemporary, pre-hip-hop era."

Track listing
"Never, Never Gonna Give You Up"
"Hold On, I'm Comin'"
"Wake Up Everybody"
"Minute by Minute"
"I'm In Love"
"Don't Ask My Neighbors"
"Love Ballad"
"Let It Be Me"
"How Deep Is Your Love"
"(Every Time I Turn Around) Back in Love Again"
"Respect Yourself"
" If You Love Somebody Set Them Free" (CD Bonus Track)

Personnel
Otis Williams (baritone)
Ron Tyson (tenor/falsetto)
Terry Weeks (tenor)
Joe Herndon (bass)
Bruce Williamson (tenor/baritone)

Charts

References 

2007 albums
The Temptations albums
Covers albums